Radzanowo  is a village in Płock County, Masovian Voivodeship, in east-central Poland. It is the seat of the gmina (administrative district) called Gmina Radzanowo.

The village has a population of 860.

References 

Radzanowo
Płock Governorate
Warsaw Voivodeship (1919–1939)